The men's 400 metres hurdles event at the 1987 Pan American Games was held in Indianapolis, United States on 10 and 12 August.

Medalists

Results

Heats

Final

References

Athletics at the 1987 Pan American Games
1987